This is a compendium of the best-selling music singles. The criterion for inclusion is to sell at least ten million copies worldwide. The singles listed here were cited by reliable sources from various media, such as digital journalism, newspapers, magazines, and books.

According to Guinness World Records, Irving Berlin's "White Christmas" (1942) as performed by Bing Crosby is the best-selling single worldwide, with estimated sales of over 50 million copies. The song, recognized as "the best-selling single of all time", was released before the pop/rock singles-chart era and "was listed as the world's best-selling single in the first-ever Guinness Book of Records (published in 1955) and—remarkably—still retains the title more than 50 years later". Guinness World Records also states that double A-side charity single "Candle in the Wind 1997"/"Something About the Way You Look Tonight" (1997) by Elton John (rewritten as a tribute to Diana, Princess of Wales, rather than Marilyn Monroe in the original 1973 version), is "the biggest-selling single since UK and US singles charts began in the 1950s, having accumulated worldwide sales of 33 million copies". This makes it the second-best-selling physical single of all time.

Two best-selling singles lists are displayed here relating first to physical singles (mainly CD and vinyl singles) and second to digital singles (digitally downloaded tracks which first became available to purchase in the early 2000s).

Best-selling physical singles

15million physical copies or more

10–14.9million copies

Best-selling digital singles

15million digital copies or more

10–14.99million copies

Best-selling singles by year worldwide

See also

List of best-selling singles by country
List of best-selling singles in the United States
List of best-selling Latin singles in the United States
List of best-selling sheet music
List of best-selling music artists
List of best-selling albums
List of best-selling albums of the 21st century
List of highest-certified music artists in the United States: This lists the top 100 certified music artists (albums), and the top 50 certified music artists (digital singles).
IFPI Global Recording Artist of the Year

Notes

a. Sales figure includes 'equivalent track streams'.
b. Most of them includes 'equivalent track streams'.

References

Bibliography